John XI may refer to:

 Pope John XI, ruled in 931–935
 John XI Yeshu, Syriac Orthodox Patriarch of Antioch in 1208–1220
 John XI of Constantinople, Ecumenical Patriarch in 1275–1282
 Pope John XI of Alexandria, ruled in 1427–1452
 John XI Helou, Maronite Patriarch of Antioch in 1809–1823